The Harris Clash is an annual racing event held in early August.  The event is sanctioned by IMCA and promoted by Bob Harris Enterprises. It is widely regarded as being one of the best IMCA modified races in the country, drawing hundreds of cars and thousands of fans every year.

The Harris Clash was started in 1992 by Bob Harris of the  Harris Auto Racing Company (current owner of Bob Harris Enterprises) as a challenge to other racing chassis manufacturers.  Not only is the winning driver of the race given national recognition, but unlike other major events, the car manufacturer is also given major exposure. In 2015, the event included two classes: IMCA Modifieds and IMCA SportMods (which is an entry-level modified division). The IMCA Late Models are no longer included in the Harris Clash event. 

It was announced that the 2018 Harris Clash would be moved to the Deer Creek Speedway, in Spring Valley, MN. The 2018 event was the first IMCA race held at the track.

Harris Clash Winners (Chassis Manufacturer)
Modifieds:
1992: Kelly Shryock (Harris Chassis) at Webster City
1993: Denny Hovinga (Harris Chassis) at Webster City
1994: Bill Davis, Sr. (Harris Chassis) at Boone
1995: Tim Donlinger (Kosiski Chassis) at Harlan
1996: Mark Noble (Pro Chassis) at Knoxville
1997: Kelly Shryock (Harris Chassis) at Knoxville
1998: Bill Davis, Sr. (Harris Chassis) at Knoxville
1999: Troy Folkerts (Racemart Chassis) at Knoxville
2000: John Logue (Harris Chassis) at Knoxville
2001: Johnny Saathoff (Jet Chassis) at Knoxville
2002: Scott Allen (Dirt Works Chassis) at Knoxville
2003: Greg Metz (Harris Chassis) at Knoxville
2004: Gary Clark (Dirt Works Chassis) at Knoxville
2005: Greg Metz (Harris Chassis) at Knoxville
2006: Jeremie Hedrick (Race Tech Chassis) at Knoxville
2007: Clayton Christensen (Skyrocket Chassis) at Knoxville
2008: RAIN at Knoxville
2009: Jay Noteboom (Harris Chassis) at Knoxville
2010: Richie Gustin (Skyrocket Chassis) at Knoxville
2011: Eric Dailey (Skyrocket Chassis) at Knoxville
2012: Kyle Strickler (Harris Chassis) at Knoxville
2013: Kyle Strickler (Harris Chassis) at Knoxville
2014: Chris Abelson (Razor Chassis) at Knoxville
2015: Ethan Dotson (GRT Chassis) at Webster City
2016: Joel Rust (Rage Chassis) at Webster City
2017: Richie Gustin (Gheer'd Up Chassis) at Webster City
2018: Cayden Carter (VanderBuilt Race Cars) at Deer Creek
2019: Austin Arneson (VanderBuilt Race Cars) at Deer Creek
2020: Ethan Dotson (Victory Circle Chassis) at Deer Creek
2021: Zane DeVilbiss (DeVilbiss Chassis) at Deer Creek
2022: Tom Beery Jr. (Harris Chassis) at Deer Creek

Sport Modifieds:
2006: Jacob Murray (Hoover Chassis) at Knoxville
2007: Brett Moffitt (Victory Chassis) at Knoxville
2008: RAIN at Knoxville
2009: Matt Lettow (Skyrocket Chassis) at Knoxville
2010: Jared Timmerman (Harris Chassis) at Knoxville
2011: Jesse Sobbing (Razor Chassis) at Knoxville
2012: Matt Lettow (Skyrocket Chassis) at Knoxville
2013: Doug Smith (Harris Chassis) at Knoxville
2014: Brett Lowry (Harris Chassis) at Knoxville
2015: Doug Smith  (Harris Chassis) at Webster City
2016: Adam Armstrong (Jet Chassis) at Webster City
2017: Jared VanDeest (Skyrocket Chassis) at Webster City
2018: Jake McBirnie (GRT Chassis) at Deer Creek
2019: Brayton Carter (VanderBuilt Race Cars) at Deer Creek
2020: Cody Thompson (Razor Chassis) at Deer Creek
2021: Rocky Caudle (GRT by BHE) at Deer Creek
2022: Alec Fett (GRT by BHE) at Deer Creek

Late Models:
2009: Tommy Elston (GRT Chassis) at Knoxville
2010: Ray Guss, Jr. (Mastersbilt Chassis) at Knoxville
2011: Nate Beuseling (Mach-1 Chassis) at Knoxville

External links
Harris Clash
International Motor Contest Association (IMCA)
Knoxville Raceway
Bob Harris Enterprises

Stock car races
Dirt track racing in the United States